Centre de Flacq or Central Flacq is the metropolitan area of Flacq District, located in the center of the district, the village is one of the most developed and popular villages in Mauritius. Home of several commercials and public institutions, the village topped the list of the most developed village in Flacq District. The village is administered by the Centre de Flacq Village Council under the aegis of the Flacq District Council. According to the census made by Statistics Mauritius in 2011, the population was at 15,791. The main source of transportation are taxi and bus service and English was registered as its official language and is highly exercised for notifications and advertisements.

Sports 
The local football team is the Faucon Flacq SC, their home stadium is the Stade Auguste Vollaire.

See also 
 Districts of Mauritius
 List of places in Mauritius

References 

Populated places in Mauritius
Flacq District